Eneko Fernández de Garayalde Jiménez (born 26 May 1984 in Zaragoza, Aragon) is a Spanish professional footballer who plays as a right winger.

External links

1984 births
Living people
Footballers from Zaragoza
Spanish footballers
Association football wingers
Segunda División players
Segunda División B players
Tercera División players
CD Universidad de Zaragoza players
Real Zaragoza B players
FC Barcelona Atlètic players
SD Ejea players
Deportivo Alavés players
CE Sabadell FC footballers
Real Oviedo players
CD Tudelano footballers